This is an incomplete, chronological list of films produced in the Khmer language between 1955 and 1975.

The Golden Age of Khmer Cinema was a period when Khmer films could compete with other international films in terms of standards and quality. Unique to this era is the union of music and film featuring Cambodia's most talented actors and singers. As nearly every film produced in this era is accompanied by at least one song from Sinn Sisamouth, Ros Sereysothea or other singers of the era. Between 1965 - 1975, at least 300 films were produced and screened throughout the nation's theatres. It ended abruptly in April 1975 with the rise of the Khmer Rouge.

1950s

1960–66

Cambodian films of 1965
Cambodian films of 1967
Cambodian films of 1968
Cambodian films of 1969
Cambodian films of 1970
Cambodian films of 1971
Cambodian films of 1972
Cambodian films of 1973
Cambodian films of 1974

See also
List of Khmer Soap Operas
List of Khmer entertainment companies
List of Khmer film actors
List of Khmer film directors

External links
Films from Cambodia at the Internet Movie Database
Khmer-language films at the Internet Movie Database
Filmography of Norodom Sihanouk

1950s
Films
Films
Films
Cambodian
Cambodian
Cambodian